Sir  Archibald Tutton James Salvidge  (5 August 1863 – 11 December 1928) was an English politician, most notable for securing the political dominance of the Conservative Party in Liverpool through the use of the Working Men's Conservative Association (WMCA), earning him the nickname "the king of Liverpool" (by Warden Chilcott, MP for Liverpool Walton). Salvidge was not a member of the Orange Order but he claimed on the Glorious Twelfth of July 1891 that his principles and the Orangemen's were one and the same due to the WMCA's requiring members "to be a sound Protestant". Due to the high Irish immigration into Liverpool and the widespread sectarianism in the city, Salvidge managed to galvanise Liverpool's Protestant population behind the Conservative Party in their opposition to Irish Home Rule.

Notes

Further reading
Stanley Salvidge, Salvidge of Liverpool: Behind the Political Scene, 1890–1928 (Hodder & Stoughton, 1934).
P. J. Waller, Democracy and Sectarianism: A Political and Social History of Liverpool, 1868–1939 (Liverpool University Press, 1981).

1863 births
1928 deaths
Knights Commander of the Order of the British Empire
Members of the Privy Council of the United Kingdom
Political bosses
Conservative Party (UK) people